Takakuwa (written: 高桑) is a Japanese surname. Notable people with the surname include:

, Japanese footballer
, Japanese swimmer

Japanese-language surnames